The Aroa mines were copper mines in the state of Yaracuy, Venezuela. 
Mining started in 1632, and at the end of the colonial period the mines were owned by the Bolívar family. Simón Bolívar leased the mines to an English company, and after his death his sisters sold the mines. They continued to be operated by English companies, using Cornish and local miners, until 1936. Today the mines are closed and partially flooded. Their remains are preserved by the Parque Bolivariano Minas de Aroa and may be visited by the public.

Location

The Aroa copper deposits are located in the Bolivar Iron Quadrilateral mining district.
The climate is warm and humid, and the area is covered in thick forest.

Early years
In the 16th century it was known that there was gold in the Yaracuy, Santa Cruz and Aroa rivers, and in 1605 gold deposits were found in a small valley leading to the Aroa River.
The King of Spain gave the mines in perpetuity to Dr. Francisco Marín de Narváez and his heirs in exchange for 40,000 pesos.
Mining began in 1632, following gold veins, which led to discovery of large deposits of copper.
The mines attracted the indigenous Gayones Indians of the Duaca region,  to the southwest.
They came in part for the wages, in part because at the mines they could practice their traditional religion without interference by Catholic priests.

Around the end of the 17th century the "Cobre Caracas" mining company became the property of the family of Simón Bolívar (1783–1830).
The largest of the mines, La Vizcaina, was worked by 60 to 70 slaves.
There was a surge in copper production in the 1790s.
Alexander von Humboldt said the mines held some of the finest copper in the world.
According to an 1825 newspaper report, "The Aroa mines have been but partially and defectively worked by the old Spanish Govt., about 40 of the natives only being employed at one time and even then yielded 300 tons of refined copper annually."

English mining operation
The fighting continued in Venezuela from 1810 to 1821, when the decisive Battle of Carabobo took place.
In 1824 Bolivar leased the mines to British entrepreneurs. According to some sources his aim was to help finance the struggle for independence from Spain.
Captain Joseph Malachy sailed from Plymouth in March 1825 to take up his position as agent and resident director of the Bolivar Mining Association at the Aroa copper mines.
Malachy was given the huge salary of £1,200, compared to the typical salary of about £300 for a mine manager in Cornwall.
The British employed about 1,200 workers in the mines, including British and Venezuelans.
They used the Aroa River to carry the ore by barge to the coast, where it was loaded onto ships.

In 1832 Bolivar's sisters Juana and Maria Antonia sold the mines to the Robert Dent, an Englishman who owned the Bolívar Mining Association.
In the 1830s Cornishmen in the reduction department of the Aroa mines made significant advances in methods of calcinating the copper ore.
However, the company closed the mines in 1836 due to high mortality among the European workers and tensions with the native workers.
The Bolívar Mining Association was succeeded by companies such as the Quebrada Land Mining Company, Quebrada Railway Land and Copper Company Limited, Aroa Mines Limited and Bolívar Railway Company Limited.

The owners planned to build a railway to the coast in the 1830s under the supervision of the young English engineer, John, later Sir John, Hawkshaw.
However, the project was put off several times due to civil wars and problems at the mines.
The mines were damaged during the Federal War (1859–1863).
Finally a narrow gauge line from Aroa to the port of Tucacas was opened in 1877.
The railway was built by the British-controlled New Quebrada Railway, Land, and Copper Company, which also established a shipping service from Tucacas to Puerto Cabello, the region's main import-export centre.
The Ferrocarril Bolívar was the first railway in Venezuela.
Also in 1877 the road from Barquisimeto to Aroa was upgraded so it could be used by wagons and carts.
In 1891 the railway was extended from Aroa via Duaca to Barquisimeto.

During the Venezuelan crisis of 1902–03 Britain, Germany and Italy imposed a naval blockade due to Venezuela's refusal to pay damages suffered during the Federal War.
In 1903 the British-Venezuelan Commission made an arbitration decision in the Aroa Mines Case that damages would not be allowed for injury to people or property committed by the troops of unsuccessful rebels.
The umpire quoted an 1868 judgement that "Damages done to property in consequence of battles being fought upon it between the belligerents is to be ascribed to the hazards of war and can not be made the foundation of a claim against the government of the country in which the engagement took place."

Aroa was the first town in the country to obtain electricity and telephone service.
A cableway was built linking the mines to the town.
In 1915 the mines were owned by the South American Copper Syndicate Ltd.
In 1930 they were operated by the English-owned Bolivar Mining Association, which used coastal mangrove trees for lumber in the mines.
There were six mines, the Aroa Norte, Titiara, Titiara Norte, San Antonio, Zajón Verde 1 and Zajón Verde 2. 

Later years

The mines were abandoned in 1936.
In 1957 the Venezuelan state acquired the mines and transferred them to the Venezuelan Petrochemical Institute, which extracted pyrite and copper carbonate from them for the production of sulfuric acid. In 1972 the Institute transferred its rights to Yaracuy state.
The  Parque Minas de Aroa (Aroa Mines Park) was created on 21 September 1974, containing the old mine workings.
There is a small museum with records of the mine.
The mines are now partially flooded.

Notes

Sources

 

Copper mines in Venezuela
Yaracuy
Bolívar family